Culpepper was an American Thoroughbred racehorse. He won the 1874 Preakness Stakes.

Background

Culpepper was bred by D. J. Crouse in the state of Ohio. His sire was Revolver, and his dam was Gentle Annie.

Racing Career

As a two-year-old, Culpepper ran in the July Stakes, coming in third. At some point after the two-old-season, Culpepper was sold to trainer Hugh Gaffney. As a three-year-old, he ran in the Preakness Stakes, ridden by William Donohue. The favorite to win the race was Saxon, a British-bred horse who would go on to win that year's Belmont Stakes. He ended up coming in last in the Preakness, and Culpepper won the race. 

Culpepper's success was not replicated in the Withers Stakes, in which he came 13th. He then came fifth in the Sequel Stakes. His performance started to pick up again when he came second in the Summer Handicap, won a sweepstakes at Prospect Park in Buffalo, New York on August 18th, came second in another sweepstakes on September 9th, came second in a mile heat two days later, and won another sweepstakes on September 14th.

Pedigree

References

1871 racehorse births
Racehorses bred in Ohio
Racehorses trained in the United States
Preakness Stakes winners
Thoroughbred family A37